A list of films produced in Egypt in 1942. For an A-Z list of films currently on Wikipedia, see :Category:Egyptian films.

External links
 Egyptian films of 1942 at the Internet Movie Database
 Egyptian films of 1942 elCinema.com

Lists of Egyptian films by year
1942 in Egypt
Lists of 1942 films by country or language